Morris Emmerson (born 23 October 1942) is an English former professional footballer who played as a goalkeeper.

Career
Born in Sunniside, Emmerson made 17 appearances in the Football League for Middlesbrough and Peterborough United between 1962 and 1964. Emmerson retired from the game at age 22, as he didn't view it as a secure enough career for his family, and instead began work in the IT business.

References

1942 births
Living people
English footballers
Middlesbrough F.C. players
Peterborough United F.C. players
English Football League players
Association football goalkeepers
Footballers from County Durham